Statistics of Qatar Stars League for the 1984–85 season.

Overview
It was contested by 7 teams, and Al-Arabi Sports Club won the championship.

League standings

References
Qatar - List of final tables (RSSSF)

1984–85 in Asian association football leagues
1984–85 in Qatari football